Analise Ortiz is an American politician, activist, and former journalist who is a member of the Arizona House of Representatives for the 24th district. Elected in November 2022, she assumed office on January 9, 2023.

Early life and education 
Ortiz was born and raised in Arizona. She earned a Bachelor of Arts degree in broadcast journalism from Arizona State University in 2014.

Career 
Ortiz began her career as a breaking news reporter for The Arizona Republic. From 2015 to 2017, she worked as a multimedia journalist for KGBT-TV in Harlingen, Texas. She then worked for KTNV-TV in Las Vegas. From 2018 to 2021, Ortiz worked for the ACLU of Arizona as a communications and campaign strategist. Since 2021, she has worked as a communication strategist at Rural Arizona Engagement. Ortiz was elected to the Arizona House of Representatives in November 2022.

References 

Living people
People from Scottsdale, Arizona
Arizona Democrats
Members of the Arizona House of Representatives
Women state legislators in Arizona
Arizona State University alumni
Year of birth missing (living people)